Live Tour 2010: Universe (stylized as LIVE TOUR 2010 ~UNIVERSE~) is the 10th LIVE DVD from Koda Kumi and is the live tour that corresponds with her album Best: Third Universe. The concert's theme was outer space and the shuttle used for the voyage (on all concert merchandise) was Koda Airline

The DVD has two discs: the first containing the concert footage and the second with bonus features and the making-of. Both discs include audio commentary. The DVD charted #1 on the Oricon Chart and has sold over 67,078.

Track list
(Official Track list)

DVD1
0. "Opening Movie"
"Step Into My World"
"Universe"
"BUT"<Interlude Movie 1>
"Lick me♥"
"Superstar"
"Koi no Tsubomi" (Airline Ver.)
"Stay"<Interlude Movie 2>
"Got to Be Real"
"Cutie Honey"
"Dance Part"
"Ecstasy"
"Physical Thing"
"No Way"<Interlude Movie 3>
"Ai no Uta"
"futari de..."
"You're So Beautiful"<Interlude Movie 4>
"Can We Go Back"
"Freaky"
"Work It Out!"
"Hashire!"
"With your smile"Encore
"Single Medley: Lady Go! / stay with me / Butterfly / Last Angel / Taboo / girls / Good☆day
"Comes Up"
"walk"

DVD2
"Universe Space Channel"

Show dates

References

2010 video albums
Koda Kumi video albums
Live video albums